Ederies Arendse is a South African rugby union player for  in the Currie Cup and in the Rugby Challenge. His usual position is Wing.

Career

Western Province
He made his first team debut for Western Province during the 2012 Vodacom Cup, in their game against . He made a total of ten appearances in that campaign, including in the final win against .

He was then also included in the squad for the 2012 Currie Cup Premier Division.

Griquas
He was contracted by Kimberley-based side  for 2014.

References

External links
itsrugby.co.uk profile

South African rugby union players
Rugby union players from Cape Town
Cape Coloureds
South African people of Dutch descent
Rugby union wings
Living people
1987 births
Western Province (rugby union) players
Griquas (rugby union) players